Pilgrimage is a 2001 documentary film by Werner Herzog. Accompanied only by music the film alternates between shots of pilgrims near the tomb of Saint Sergei in Sergiyev Posad, Russia and pilgrims at the Basilica of Guadalupe in Mexico. The score was composed by John Tavener and performed by the BBC Symphony Orchestra with vocal accompaniment by Parvin Cox and the Westminster Cathedral Choir. The film begins with a supposed quote by Thomas à Kempis, invented by Herzog.

References

External links 
 
 , BBC Q&A with Werner Herzog

2001 films
Documentary films about Christianity
2001 short documentary films
German short documentary films
British short documentary films
2000s English-language films
2000s British films
2000s German films